State Road 24 is an IB-class/expressway road in central Serbia, connecting Batočina with Kraljevo. It is located in Šumadija and Western Serbia.

Before the new road categorization regulation given in 2013, the route wore the following names: M 1.11, M 23 and M 23.1 (before 2012) / 15 and 16 (after 2012).

The existing route is a main road with two traffic lanes, except for Batočina – Kragujevac section which is partially built by expressway standards, and defined in the Space Plan of Republic of Serbia.

Sections

See also 
 Roads in Serbia
 Expressway 24
 National Road (M)1.11
 National Road (M)23
 National Road (M)23.1

References

External links 
 Official website – Roads of Serbia (Putevi Srbije)
 Official website – Corridors of Serbia (Koridori Srbije) (Serbian)

State roads in Serbia